Nothognathini is a weevil tribe in the subfamily Entiminae.

References 

 Marshall, G.A.K. 1916: Coleoptera. Rhynchophora: Curculionidae. Shipley, A. E. (ed.): The Fauna of British India, including Ceylon and Burma. : xv + 367 pp. Taylor & Francis. London.
 Alonso-Zarazaga, M.A.; Lyal, C.H.C. 1999: A world catalogue of families and genera of Curculionoidea (Insecta: Coleoptera) (excepting Scolytidae and Platypodidae). Entomopraxis, Barcelona.

External links 

Entiminae
Polyphaga tribes